Amealco is a town in the Mexican state of Querétaro. Its name is thought to mean place of springs in Nahuatl. The municipality seat, also called Amealco, is located 63 km southeast of Santiago de Querétaro. Its elevation is 2,605 meters above sea level, and the annual temperature ranges from 15 to 20 °C. It is one of the oldest settlements of Querétaro, being founded in 1538 by Fernando de Tapia (also known as Conín) and Nicolás de San Luis Montañez, who would also found the State capital.

In the early 19th century, a group of French and Spanish entrepreneurs settled in the city and began the logging industry, which at its peak was one of the main suppliers of wood to Mexico City, and also exported wood to France and the United States. The governments of these two countries issued diplomas kept in the Palacio Municipal that certify the quality of Amealco's products.

The Hñähñu or Otomí people are concentrated in the southern and eastern parts of the municipality, in 34 settlements. The main ones are Santiago Mexquititlán and San Ildefonso Tultepec.  They number around 20,000 people, or 36% of the total population. Amealco is the municipality with the highest concentration of indigenous people, with almost 80% of the State's total.

Notable people
Macedonia Blas Flores, women's rights activist
Monseñor Leopoldo Ruiz y Flores, Obispo de la arquidioses de León y Monterrey, Arzobispo de Morelia y Delegado Apostólico de México ante la Santa Sede. Participó como uno de los más destacados personajes en la “Guerra Cristera”, habiéndose enfrentado a Plutarco Elías Calles defendiendo su causa de evangelización.
Ricardo Pozas Arciniega, fue un distinguido antropólogo, investigador e indigenista mexicano.
Roberto Ruiz Obregón, Fue pionero de la industria queretana y gran benefactor a favor de la educación, considerado como “Hijo Predilecto de Amealco”, en donde impulsó a la educación y múltiples obras de trascendencia social en bien de la sociedad amealcense

See also
Mexican rag dolls (Marias)

References

 Amealco de Bonfil, Enciclopedia de los Municipios de México, Instituto Nacional para el Federalismo y el Desarrollo Municipal, SEGOB.  Accessed on line November 15, 2007.

External links
 Municipio de Amealco de Bonfil, Querétaro, official government web site.
 Amealco, lugar de manantiales (Querétaro), México Desconocido tourism web site.

Populated places in Querétaro
Populated places established in 1538
1538 establishments in New Spain
Otomi settlements